Vangelis Nousios (born 6 July 1998) is a Greek professional footballer who plays as a right winger for Super League 2 club Apollon Larissa.

References

1998 births
Living people
Greek footballers
Super League Greece players
Super League Greece 2 players
Athlitiki Enosi Larissa F.C. players
Apollon Larissa F.C. players
Association football wingers
Footballers from Larissa